47-53 Lower Fort Street, Millers Point are heritage-listed terrace houses located at 47-53 Lower Fort Street, in the inner city Sydney suburb of Millers Point in the City of Sydney local government area of New South Wales, Australia. The property was added to the New South Wales State Heritage Register on 2 April 1999.

History 
Millers Point is one of the earliest areas of European settlement in Australia, and a focus for maritime activities. This building is one of a group of late nineteenth century terraces. First tenanted by NSW Department of Housing in 1992.

Description 

Three storey, six bedroom Victorian Italianate terrace house with iron lace balustrading and friezes and brackets. Top floor has two double hung sash windows and incised motifs, middle floor has two french doors opening onto balcony, and ground floor has two sash windows and front door with fanlight above. Steps to basement lead from front porch. Storeys: 3 Construction: Painted rendered masonry. Corrugated galvanised iron roofing. Timber with iron lace balcony, cast iron central column. Style: Victorian Italianate.

The external condition of the property is good.

Modifications and dates 
External: Timber handrail added. Fenestration altered.

Heritage listing 
As at 23 November 2000, this is a group of three storey Victorian Italianate terraces, representing a quality streetscape element.

It is part of the Millers Point Conservation Area, an intact residential and maritime precinct. It contains residential buildings and civic spaces dating from the 1830s and is an important example of 19th century adaptation of the landscape.

47-53 Lower Fort Street, Millers Point was listed on the New South Wales State Heritage Register on 2 April 1999.

See also 

Australian residential architectural styles
55 Lower Fort Street

References

Bibliography

Attribution

External links

 

New South Wales State Heritage Register sites located in Millers Point
Lower Fort Street, Millers Point, 47-53
Terraced houses in Sydney
Articles incorporating text from the New South Wales State Heritage Register
Millers Point, Lower Fort Street 47-53
Millers Point Conservation Area